Xignature is the fourth studio album by South Korean singer Kim Junsu, released under his stage name XIA on 30 May 2016. The album features artists The Quiett, Automatic, Crucial Star, and Paloalto.

Background
The album name is a blend of his stage name "Xia" and the word "Signature". The album features various genres, such as, Hip Hop, EDM, R&B, Urban, etc.

On May 18, Xia released a promotional single, "..Is You". The song debuted at No. 19 on the Gaon digital chart, selling 72,183 copies in its first week.
The album tracklist was released on May 26 on JYJ's YouTube channel. Xia promoted the album with a live outdoor showcase held at the east gate of the COEX Mall in Seoul on May 30. He also had his own segment on Melon Radio.

Track listing

Release history

References

2016 albums
Kakao M albums
Korean-language albums
Kim Junsu albums